Elisabete Weiderpass-Vainio is a Brazilian cancer researcher who is Director of the International Agency for Research on Cancer, a part of the World Health Organization. Her research considers the epidemiology and prevention of cancer.

Early life and education 
Weiderpass is from Santo André, São Paulo. In an interview with The Lancet she explained that she grew up in a working-class family, and that it was unclear whether or not she would attend university. Her parents encouraged her to continue her studies, and she was awarded a scholarship to study medicine at the Federal University of Pelotas in south Brazil. During her undergraduate degree, Weiderpass became increasingly interested in epidemiology and public health. She remained at the Federal University of Pelotas for her graduate studies, where she completed a master's degree in epidemiology. Weiderpass moved to the Karolinska Institute for her doctoral studies, where she studied the aetiology of endometrial cancer.

Research and career 
In the early 2000s, Weiderpass started to work in Sub-Saharan Africa with the International Agency for Research on Cancer. These experiences inspired a career focused on reducing inequalities in cancer diagnosis and treatment. She developed and delivered training programmes for African medical doctors and researchers. Her students included Jackson Orem, who went on to become Director of the Uganda Cancer Institute. In 2005, she returned to the Karolinska Institute, where she continued to study the epidemiology of cancer. Her research considers women's health, with a particular focus on identifying risk factors for certain forms of cancer. She was responsible for the Ugandan Collaboration of Infectious Diseases. Weiderpass found several lifestyle risk factors, such as tobacco use, diet and obesity, can have a marked impact on a person's likelihood to suffer from cancer.

In 2007, Weiderpass was made Head of the Genetic Epidemiology Group at the Folkhälsan Research Center in Helsinki, where she spent over ten years. At the same time, she oversaw the Cancer Registry of Norway, which is located in the Institute of Population-based Cancer Research in Oslo, as well as at the University of Tromsø and Yale School of Medicine.

Weiderpass was elected Director of the International Agency for Research on Cancer in 2019. The agency is based in Lyon. Weiderpass is the first woman to hold the position. In 2020, she launched the World Cancer Report, which provides an overview of current cancer research and information on strategies for cancer prevention. She partnered with the European Society for Medical Oncology in 2020, working together to deliver a series of webinars and e-learning modules focussed on the elimination of cancer.

Awards and honours 
 2017 Elected Fellow of the European Academy of Cancer Sciences
 2017 Gansu Foreign Experts Administration Dunhuang Award for Outstanding Foreign Expert

Select publications

Personal life 
Weiderpass is a naturalised Swedish and Finnish citizen. She is married to Harri Uolevi Vainio, a professor at Kuwait University.

References

External links

Bibliographic databases

 Elisabete Weiderpass at PubMed 

Living people
Cancer researchers
People from Santo André, São Paulo
Federal University of Pelotas alumni
Karolinska Institute alumni
Brazilian women scientists
Year of birth missing (living people)